Willem van Oranje  (1934) is a Dutch drama film produced, co-written, and directed by Jan Teunissen. The film portrays the life of William the Silent, and the origins of the Dutch Revolt.

Plot
William the Silent's campaigns against the Spaniards during the Eighty Years' War and his life shown in chronological order.

Cast
 Cor Van der Lugt Melsert as William the Silent
 Willy Haak as Louise de Coligny
 Cor Hermus as Keizer Karel V
 Louise Kooiman as Juliana of Stolberg
 Cruys Voorbergh as Philip II of Spain
 Willem Huysmans as Mayor of Den Briel
 Daan Van Olleffen as Philibert van Brussel
 Vincent Berghegge as Antoine Perrenot de Granvelle
 Peter Hansen as Lodewijk Sigismund Vincent Gustaaf van Heiden

See also
Dutch films of the 1930s

References

External links 
 

1934 films
Dutch black-and-white films
Dutch biographical films
Dutch historical films
1930s historical films
Films set in the 16th century
Films set in the Netherlands
Works about the Eighty Years' War
Cultural depictions of William the Silent
Cultural depictions of Charles V, Holy Roman Emperor
1930s biographical films
1930s Dutch-language films